The pygmy round-eared bat (Lophostoma brasiliense) is a bat species from South and Central America.

Description
Its ears are large with rounded tips. Its upper lip has several small warts. The fur is dark brown or black in color. Individuals weigh .

Biology and ecology
It is insectivorous, though it may also consume fruit. It is nocturnal, roosting in sheltered places during the day such as hollow trees or within termite mounds.

Range and habitat
It is found in several countries in Central and South America, including: Belize, Bolivia, Brazil, Colombia, Costa Rica, Ecuador, French Guiana, Guatemala, Guyana, Honduras, Mexico, Nicaragua, Panama, Peru, Suriname, Trinidad and Tobago, and Venezuela.

As of 2016, it was evaluated as a least-concern species by the IUCN.

References

Lophostoma
Bats of Central America
Bats of South America
Bats of Brazil
Mammals of Colombia
Mammals described in 1866
Taxa named by Wilhelm Peters